Shelltown is an unincorporated community and census-designated place (CDP) in Blair County, Pennsylvania, United States. It was first listed as a CDP prior to the 2020 census.

The CDP is in eastern Blair County, in the northern part of Woodbury Township. It is bordered to the north by the borough of Williamsburg. Pennsylvania Route 866 passes through the community, leading north into Williamsburg and southwest  to Martinsburg.

References 

Census-designated places in Blair County, Pennsylvania
Census-designated places in Pennsylvania